Gözde Sinem Öztürk (born 9 January 1985) is a Turkish actress and presenter. She notably played the fashionably conservative role of Sukran in Turking TV series  (2012–14).

Sinem Öztürk was born on 9 January 1985 in Istanbul, Öztürk was raised in Adapazarı, Marmara Region, before her family moved to Germany. Öztürk attended the Gutenberg-Gymnasium in Wiesbaden and studied management at the University of Mainz. Following her diploma, she moved back to Istanbul, where she started her acting career.

Filmography

References

1985 births
Turkish television presenters
Turkish women television presenters
Living people
Johannes Gutenberg University Mainz alumni
Cağaloğlu Anadolu Lisesi alumni